This is a list of lowest-income places in the United States. According to the United States Census Bureau, the following are the places in the United States with the lowest median household income. Locations with populations from the 2013—2017 American Community Survey are ranked by median household income — the median household income figures are also from the 2013—2017 American Community Survey.  The "places" used in this article are what the U.S. Census Bureau defines as "places" (such as Census-Designated Places, or CDPs). In the United States (in 2017), the place with the lowest median household income was Little River, California (population 117), while the place with the lowest median household income with a population of more than 1,000 was Comerío Zona Urbana in Comerío, Puerto Rico (population 4,312).

In terms of geographic size, Pine Ridge Indian Reservation and the adjacent Rosebud Indian Reservation (Lakota Sioux Reservations, South Dakota) have long been among the lowest income areas in the United States — Wounded Knee, South Dakota, which is within the Pine Ridge Reservation, had the 7th lowest median household income out of all places in the 50 states/D.C./Puerto Rico (in 2017).

In terms of population size, 3 out of 5 of the largest counties (populations over 1000) are predominantly, or majority white, ranging from 98% to 99% white, while two counties are predominantly black at 60% and 68% black, while the fifth one is 99% Native American. 

The U.S. territories have the highest poverty rates in the United States (higher than the poverty rates of the U.S. mainland), and many of the lowest-income places in the United States are found in the U.S. territories of Puerto Rico and American Samoa. In 2018, Comerío Municipality, Puerto Rico had a median household income of $12,812 — the lowest of any county or county-equivalent in the United States.

Places (2013—2017 American Community Survey)

The data below is for annual median household income in the 50 states, the District of Columbia, and Puerto Rico — the data is based on 2013–2017 American Community Survey data from the U.S. Census Bureau; populations are also from the 2013–2017 American Community Survey. Places with a population of over 1,000 are shown in bold. 

Most of the lowest-income places with more than 1,000 people are located in Puerto Rico. Places in Puerto Rico such as zona urbanas and comunidads are Census-Designated Places. Locations in the U.S. territories (other than Puerto Rico) are included, but are not ranked because they have 2010 data. Data is collected annually for the 50 states, District of Columbia and Puerto Rico (in American Community Survey estimates), but data is not collected annually in other U.S. territories. 

For comparison, in 2017 the median household income of the United States (excluding the U.S. territories) was $57,652.

Other places

Other places (in the 50 states) that had a low median household income and a population greater than 1,000 (in 2017):

Batesville CDP, Texas - $13,697 (Population 1,163)
Uniontown, Alabama - $14,094 (Population 2,234)
Citrus City CDP, Texas - $14,113 (Population 2,843)
Tchula, Mississippi - $14,412 (Population 1,845)
Baldwin, Michigan - $14,464 (Population 1,310)
Franklin, Georgia - $15,313 (Population 1,050)
Notre Dame CDP, Indiana - $15,625 (Population 6,720)
Highland Park, Michigan - $15,699 (Population 10,955)
Warrenton, Georgia - $15,781 (Population 1,994)

Other places in the U.S. territories (excluding Puerto Rico) with a low median household income in 2010:

Failolo, American Samoa - $13,750 (Population 108)
Chalan Kanoa III, Northern Mariana Islands - $14,141 (Population 794)
Chalan Kanoa IV, Northern Mariana Islands - $14,250 (Population 631)
Chalan Piao, Northern Mariana Islands - $14,286 (Population 1,282)
Chalan Kanoa II, Northern Mariana Islands - $14,293 (Population 921)
Afetnas, Northern Mariana Islands - $14,549 (Population 1,486)
San Jose (Oleai), Saipan, Northern Mariana Islands - $14,783 (Population 954)
Garapan, Northern Mariana Islands - $14,940 (Population 3,983)
Chalan Kanoa I, Northern Mariana Islands - $15,156 (Population 1,304)
Maia, American Samoa - $15,625 (Population 153)

Per capita income

American Samoa has the lowest per capita income in the United States. American Samoa's Manu'a District had a per capita income of $5,441 in 2010, while American Samoa overall had a per capita income of $6,311 in 2010. Puerto Rico's municipalities also have low per capita incomes — in 2018, Maricao Municipality, Puerto Rico had a per capita income of $5,974, the lowest of any county or county-equivalent in the American Community Survey. Puerto Rico overall had a per capita income of $12,451 in 2018.

Among U.S. states, Mississippi had a low per capita income in 2018 ($23,434).

Large cities with a high percentage of low income residents

For the survey, a large city is defined as a city with a population of 250,000 or more. Percentage of residents living below the U.S. government established poverty income level is listed, based on 2018 US Census estimates.

Memphis, Tennessee 42.3%
Detroit, Michigan 36.1%
Baltimore, Maryland 34.1%
Miami, Florida 31.7%
Fresno, California 31.5%
Buffalo, New York 30.9%
Newark, New Jersey 30.4%
Toledo, Ohio 30.1%
Milwaukee, Wisconsin 29.9%
St. Louis, Missouri 29.2%

2000 census

The most sizable community in 2000 (with a population of 13,138) was Kiryas Joel, New York which had a per capita income of just $4,355.

See also

List of lowest-income counties in the United States
Persistent poverty county
Poverty in the United States

Notes

References

Bibliography
Statistics derived from U.S. Census Bureau data; U.S. Department of Commerce, Bureau of Economic Analysis, Survey of Current Business; and DataQuick Information Systems, a public records database company located in La Jolla, San Diego, CA.

Lists of places in the United States
Economy-related lists of superlatives
United States demography-related lists

Poverty in the United States